Elections to the new City of York unitary authority were held on 4 May 1995, although the new unitary authority wasn't officially created until April 1996.  All 53 council seats in the city were up for election and the Labour Party won overall control of the council.

Labour had controlled the 1973-1995 York City Council as a majority group since 1986 but following the creation of an expanded City of York unitary authority 22 councillors were returned to represent parished areas previously part of the more rural district council areas of Ryedale (14 councillors), Selby (6) and Harrogate (2). These areas were generally considered to be less fertile territory for Labour. The 15 former York City Council wards were unchanged for this election but each unitary ward elected two councillors, rather than three. The only exception was Foxwood Ward, which continued to return three councillors on the basis of population growth.

In the context of a nationwide disaster for the Conservative Party, Labour won all but four of the former York City Council wards (all four were held by the Liberal Democrats), including both seats in Micklegate, previously a safe Conservative ward. In the parished areas outside the former York city council boundary Labour won three seats (Fulford, Heslington and Copmanthorpe) and the Liberal Democrats won 14. The Conservatives were reduced to just three seats and two Independent councillors were also elected.

Election result

Ward results

Acomb ward

 * Represented the Acomb ward of York City Council, 19911996 
 † Represented the Acomb ward of York City Council, 19861996 
 ‡ Represented the Beckfield ward of York City Council, 19761979,  and the Beckfield division of North Yorkshire County Council, 19771981

Beckfield ward

 * Represented the Beckfield ward of York City Council, 19861996 
 † Represented the Foxwood ward of York City Council, 19791983

Bishophill ward

 * Represented the Bishophill ward of York City Council, 19821996 
 † Represented the Bishophill ward of York City Council, 19871996

Bootham ward

 * Represented the Bootham ward of York City Council, 19731996,  and the Bootham division of North Yorkshire County Council, 19731996 
 † Represented the Bootham ward of York City Council, 19821996,  and the Fishergate division of North Yorkshire County Council, 19851989

Clifton ward

 * Represented the Bootham ward of York City Council, 19791996,  and the Clifton division of North Yorkshire County Council, 19811996 
 † Represented the Clifton ward of York City Council, 19941996 
 ‡ Represented the Holgate ward of York City Council, 19761979,  and the Holgate division of North Yorkshire County Council, 19771981

Clifton Without ward
The parish of Clifton Without

 * Represented the Clifton Without ward of Ryedale District Council, 19911996

Copmanthorpe ward
The parishes of Acaster Malbis, Bishopthorpe, and Copmanthorpe

 * Represented the Bishopthorpe ward of Selby District Council, 19871996,  and the Bishopthorpe / Copmanthorpe division of North Yorkshire County Council, 19891996

Dunnington and Kexby ward
The parishes of Dunnington and Kexby

 * Represented the Dunnington ward of Selby District Council, 19791996 
 † Represented the Dunnington ward of Selby District Council, 19761996,  and the Dunnington division of North Yorkshire County Council, 19851996

Fishergate ward

 * Represented the Fishergate ward of York City Council, 19881996 
 † Represented the Fishergate division of North Yorkshire County Council, 19931996 
 ‡ Represented the Fishergate division of North Yorkshire County Council, 19891993

Foxwood ward

 * Represented the Westfield ward of York City Council, 19731979, the Foxwood ward of York City Council, 19791996,  the Westfield division of North Yorkshire County Council, 19731985, and the Foxwood division of North Yorkshire County Council, 19851996 
 † Represented the Foxwood ward of York City Council, 19901996 
 ‡ Represented the Clifton ward of York City Council, 19911996

Fulford ward
The parish of Fulford

 * Represented the Fulford ward of Selby District Council, 19871996

Guildhall ward

 * Represented the Guildhall division of North Yorkshire County Council, 19851996 
 † Represented the Acomb ward of York City Council, 19791984, the Guildhall ward of York City Council, 19881996,  and the Acomb division of North Yorkshire County Council, 19811989

Haxby ward
The parish of Haxby

 * Represented the Haxby North East ward of Ryedale District Council, 19911996,  and the Haxby / Strensall division of North Yorkshire County Council, 19931996 
 † Represented the Haxby North East ward of Ryedale District Council, 19831996 
 ‡ Represented the Haxby / Wigginton division of North Yorkshire County Council, 19931996

Heslington ward
The parish of Heslington

 * Represented the Heslington ward of Selby District Council, 19911996 
 † Represented the Heslington ward of Selby District Council, 19731976

Heworth ward

 * Represented the Heworth ward of York City Council, 19801996 
 † Represented the Heworth division of North Yorkshire County Council, 19891993 
 ‡ Represented the Huntington North ward of Ryedale District Council, 19871991, and the Huntington South ward of Ryedale District Council, 19911996

Heworth Without ward
The parish of Heworth Without

 * Represented the Heworth Without ward of Ryedale District Council, 19731983, and the Osbaldwick and Heworth ward of Ryedale District Council, 19831996

Holgate ward

 * Represented the Holgate ward of York City Council, 19921996 
 † Represented the Foxwood ward of York City Council, 19791988

Huntington and New Earswick ward
The parishes of Huntington and New Earswick

 * Represented the Huntington South ward of Ryedale District Council, 19831996 
 † Represented the Huntington North division of North Yorkshire County Council, 19931996 
 ‡ Represented the New Earswick ward of Ryedale District Council, 19871991,  and the Huntington South division of North Yorkshire County Council, 19851996 
 § Represented the New Earswick ward of Ryedale District Council, 19911996

Knavesmire ward

 * Represented the Knavesmire ward of York City Council, 19841996 
 † Represented the Knavesmire ward of York City Council, 19911996 
 ‡ Represented the Beckfield ward of York City Council, 19761979, and the Knavesmire ward of York City Council, 19791980

Micklegate ward

 * Represented the Walmgate ward of York City Council, 19801988, and the Heworth ward of York City Council, 19901996 
 † Represented the Micklegate ward of York City Council, 19731996,  and the Micklegate division of North Yorkshire County Council, 19931996 
 ‡ Represented the Micklegate ward of York City Council, 19911996 
 § Represented the Huntington North ward of Ryedale District Council, 19871996

Monk ward

 * Represented the Monk ward of York City Council, 19731991,  and the Monk division of North Yorkshire County Council, 19771996 
 † Represented the Monk ward of York City Council, 19921996 
 ‡ Represented the Huntington South ward of Ryedale District Council, 19911996

Osbaldwick ward
The parish of Osbaldwick

 * Represented the Osbaldwick and Heworth ward of Ryedale District Council, 19911996 
 † Represented the Clifton ward of York City Council, 19861994

Rawcliffe and Skelton ward
The parishes of Rawcliffe and Skelton

 * Represented the Rawcliffe division of North Yorkshire County Council, 19891996 
 † Represented the Rawcliffe ward of Ryedale District Council, 19731996 
 ‡ Represented the Skelton ward of Ryedale District Council, 19911996

Strensall ward
The parishes of Earswick, Holtby, Murton, Stockton-on-the-Forest, and Strensall with Towthorpe

 * Represented the Haxby West ward of Ryedale District Council, 19871996 
 † Represented the Huntington North ward of Ryedale District Council, 19911996

Upper Poppleton ward
The parishes of Askham Bryan, Askham Richard, Hessay, Nether Poppleton, Rufforth with Knapton, and Upper Poppleton

 * Represented the Beckfield ward of York City Council, 19831996,  and the Derwent number 2 division of North Yorkshire County Council, 19811985 
 † Represented the Osbaldwick / Heworth division of North Yorkshire County Council, 19851996

Walmgate ward

 * Represented the Walmgate ward of York City Council, 19731996 
 † Represented the Guildhall ward of York City Council, 19901996,  and the Walmgate division of North Yorkshire County Council, 19851996

Westfield ward

 * Represented the Westfield ward of York City Council, 19791996,  and the Westfield division of North Yorkshire County Council, 19931996 
 † Represented the Acomb ward of York City Council, 19881996 
 ‡ Represented the Westfield ward of York City Council, 19941996

Wheldrake ward
The parishes of Deighton, Elvington, Naburn, and Wheldrake

 * Represented the Wheldrake with Elvington ward of Selby District Council, 19911996 
 † Represented the Heslington ward of Selby District Council, 19791987

Wigginton ward
The parish of Wigginton

 * Represented the Haxby and Wigginton ward of Ryedale District Council, 19791987, and the Wigginton ward of Ryedale District Council, 19871996

References

1995 English local elections
1995
1990s in York